Massif des Trois-Évêchés (literally the massif of the Three Bishoprics) is a mountain range in the Provence Alps and Prealps in Alpes-de-Haute-Provence, France. Its name comes from the central summit of the massif, the Pic des Trois-Évêchés (so named because it marked the boundary between the dioceses of Digne, Embrun and Senez) where there are ridges to the north, west and south.

Geography
The massif in the broadest sense extends from north to south between the Bes to the west, the Ubaye in the north, the Verdon to the east and the Asse (approximately) to the south. It is also crossed by the Bléone and the Vallon du Laverq.

It is surrounded to the north by the Massif du Parpaillon, east by the Massif du Pelat, south-east by the Préalpes de Castellane and finally to the south and to the west by the Préalpes de Digne (which some southern peaks, or even the whole massif, are sometimes attached, although significantly higher altitudes, and different orientation).

Main summits

Tête de l'Estrop, the highest point of the massif
Grande Séolane, 
Petite Séolane, 
Trois-Évêchés, 
Tête de Chabrière, 
Roche Close, 
Sommet du Caduc, 
Mourre-Gros, 
Montagne de la Blanche,  : Bernardez, Neillère, l'Aiguillette
Les Mées, 
Tête de la Sestrière, 
Tête Noire, 
Sangraure, 
Dormillouse, 
Sommet du Tromas, 
Autapie, 
Sommet de Denjuan, 
Gros Tapy, 
Grand Croix, 
Montagne du Cheval Blanc, 

The Montagne de Cordœil, of a more modest size and elevation [], is completely isolated from the rest of the massif, the Verdon to the east and the Issole to the north and west.

Geology
The massif of the Trois-Évêchés consists of sedimentary rock, mostly sandstones and marls, typical of the pre-Alps. The geological nature of the north of the massif relates to the Ubaye Valley.

Plane crash
On 24 March 2015, Andreas Lubitz, co-pilot of Germanwings Flight 9525, who was reported to have had mental health problems, deliberately crashed the plane into the massif, after he locked the Captain out of the cockpit.

Activities

Winter sports
Val d'Allos
Pra-Loup
Saint-Jean-Montclar

Canyoning
The massif contains, amongst others, two canyoning descents of high and exceptional level: Male Vasudevan and Bussing.

See also
Haute Bléone Valley
Geography of the Western Alps

Bibliography

References

External links

Mountains of Alpes-de-Haute-Provence
Mountain ranges of the Alps